Riviera was the name of a number of steamships including:

, a South Eastern and Chatham Railway ferry
, a cruise ship built as Ocean Monarch

Ship names